Mount Baker is a neighborhood in southeast Seattle. The neighborhood's name comes from the view of Mount Baker in Whatcom County, that is seen by looking north over Lake Washington. It is bounded by Lake Washington to the east, Interstate 90 and then Leschi to the north, Rainier Valley to the west, and Columbia City to the south. The neighborhood has a community club and a rowing team. It hosts Seattle's annual Seafair, which includes an airshow featuring the U.S. Navy Blue Angels, hydroplane races, a fireworks show, and other festivities. Franklin High School and Garfield High School serve this area. It is part of Seattle's South End.

Mount Baker Community Club

The Mount Baker Community Club is a volunteer non-profit neighborhood association located next to Mount Baker Park. The organization hosts community and private events at the Mount Baker Community Clubhouse, as well as park and open space stewardship programs around the Mount Baker neighborhood. In addition, the organization publishes a newsletter to support members with community news, events and historical interest stories.

Places of worship

In 2021, Our Lady of Mount Virgin was named as one of three Catholic churches facing closure in a reorganisation plan by the Archdiocese of Seattle.

Schools and parks
Seattle Public Schools
 John Muir Elementary School
 Hawthorne Elementary School
 Franklin High School
 Garfield High School

Seattle Parks & Recreations parks, dog parks and open spaces
 Blue Dog Pond
 Bradner Gardens Park
 Colman Park
 Mount Baker Boulevard
 Mount Baker Park
 Sam Smith Park

External links

Mount Baker Community Club
Seattle City Clerk's Neighborhood Map Atlas — Mt. Baker

References